The North Carolina Department of Information Technology was established in 2015 and authorized by North Carolina General Statute 143B, Paragraph 143B-1320. It replaced and succeeded the state's Office of Information Technology.  The department provides technology services to North Carolina state agencies and related customers.

Secretaries
The department is headed by a Secretary/Chief Information Officer:
 Chris Estes, 2012-2015
 Keith Warner, 2015-2017
 Eric Boyette, 2017-2020
 Tracey Doaks, 2020-2020
 Thomas Parrish IV (acting), 2020-2021
 James Weaver, 2021-Present

References

Government of North Carolina
Information Technology
2015 establishments in North Carolina
Organizations based in Raleigh, North Carolina